Fowl Cays National Park is a national park in Central Abaco, the Bahamas, situated between Scotland Cay and Man-O-War Cay.

Flora and fauna
The park contains coral reef systems and seagrass bed, which provide habitat for surgeonfish, grunts and parrotfish. In 2017, a staghorn coral nursery was established in the park.

References

National parks of the Bahamas
Abaco Islands